Şükrü Âli Ögel (1886–1973) was a Turkish career officer, politician and the first director of the former Turkish governmental intelligence agency Milli Emniyet Hizmeti (MAH) (National Security Service), the predecessor of Milli İstihbarat Teşkilatı (MİT) today.

Biography 

Born 1886 in Trebinje of Turkish descent, he attended the military academy and joined the Ottoman army on August 13, 1909 in the rank of a second lieutenant. Şükrü Âli served as a staff officer in the West Front during the Turkish War of Independence.

He took part in the foundation of the intelligence organization Milli Emniyet Hizmeti, and was appointed on December 25, 1926 its first director. He retired from military service on December 22, 1936 as he was in the rank of a colonel, but kept his position at the MAH.

On May 25, 1937, Şükrü Âli Ögel entered the Turkish Grand National Assembly as the deputy of Istanbul. With the approval of the prime minister, he continued his position as chief of the intelligence agency beside his membership in the parliament. He quit from the MAH on July 7, 1941 after a dispute with the prime minister Refik Saydam.

He died on June 1, 1973.

External links
 Biography at the MİT website 

1886 births
1973 deaths
Military personnel from Istanbul
Ottoman Military Academy alumni
Ottoman Army officers
Ottoman military personnel of World War I
Turkish Army officers
Turkish military personnel of the Greco-Turkish War (1919–1922)
Turkish civil servants
Republican People's Party (Turkey) politicians
Date of birth missing
Place of death missing
Deputies of Istanbul